Quipazine is a serotonergic drug of the piperazine group which is used in scientific research. It was originally intended as an antidepressant but never developed for medical use.

Pharmacology

Pharmacodynamics
Quipazine is a serotonin reuptake inhibitor, and also a moderately selective serotonin receptor agonist, binding to a range of different serotonin receptors, but particularly to the 5-HT2A and 5-HT3 subtypes.

Quipazine produces a head-twitch response and other psychedelic-consistent effects in animal studies including in mice, rats, and monkeys. However, it failed to produce psychedelic effects in humans at a dose of 25 mg, which was the highest dose tested due to 5-HT3 mediated side effects of nausea and gastrointestinal discomfort. However Alexander Shulgin claimed that a fully effective psychedelic dose could be reached by blocking 5-HT3 receptors using a 5-HT3 antagonist.

Chemistry
Quipazine is synthesized by reacting 2-chloroquinoline with piperazine.

See also
 2C-B-PP
 6-Nitroquipazine
 Naphthylpiperazine
 ORG-37684
 Substituted piperazine

References

5-HT3 agonists
Abandoned drugs
Piperazines
Quinolines
Serotonin receptor agonists
Serotonin reuptake inhibitors